Bank of Rome may refer to:
 Banco di Roma
 Banca di Roma
 Banca di Credito Cooperativo di Roma
 Banco di Santo Spirito
 Cassa di Risparmio di Roma